The Centralia Canal, also known as Centralia Power Canal, is a canal in Thurston and Pierce counties, Washington, United States. It is the only feature named a canal in Western Washington. It was built in 1929 to supply water for the 12-megawatt Yelm hydroelectric project belonging to the city of Centralia's City Light Department.

Part of the canal runs through the Nisqually River Conservation Area, purchased in 2020 by the Nisqually Land Trust.

References

Sources

Further reading
Centralia City Light Yelm Hydroelectric Project, Yelm, WA at Pacific Coast Architecture Database, University of Washington Libraries

1929 establishments in Washington (state)
Canals in Washington (state)
Buildings and structures in Pierce County, Washington
Buildings and structures in Thurston County, Washington
Energy infrastructure completed in 1929
Geography of Washington (state)